These are The Official UK Charts Company UK Dance Chart number one hits of 2009. The dates listed in the menus below represent the Saturday after the Sunday the chart was announced, as per the way the dates are given in chart publications such as the ones produced by Billboard, Guinness, and Virgin.

Number ones

See also
UK Dance Chart
List of UK Dance Albums Chart number ones of 2009
2009 in British music

References

United Kingdom Dance Singles
2009
Number-one dance singles